The 20th Vanier Cup was played on November 24, 1984, at Varsity Stadium in Toronto, Ontario, and decided the CIAU football champion for the 1984 season. The Guelph Gryphons won their first ever championship by defeating the Mount Allison Mounties by a score of 22-13.

References

External links
 Official website

Vanier Cup
Vanier Cup
1984 in Toronto
November 1984 sports events in Canada